The following lists events that happened during 1992 in New Zealand.

Population
 Estimated population as of 31 December: 3,552,200
 Increase since 31 December 1991: 37,200 (1.06%)
 Males per 100 females: 97.0

Incumbents

Regal and viceregal
Head of State – Elizabeth II
Governor-General – The Hon Dame Catherine Anne Tizard, GCMG, GCVO, DBE, QSO

Government
The 43rd New Zealand Parliament continued. Government was The National Party, led by Jim Bolger. National controlled nearly seventy percent of the seats in Parliament.

Speaker of the House – Robin Gray
Prime Minister – Jim Bolger
Deputy Prime Minister – Don McKinnon
Minister of Finance – Ruth Richardson
Minister of Foreign Affairs – Don McKinnon
Chief Justice — Sir Thomas Eichelbaum

Parliamentary opposition
 Leader of the Opposition –  Mike Moore (Labour).
Alliance – Jim Anderton

Main centre leaders
Mayor of Auckland – Les Mills
Mayor of Hamilton – Margaret Evans
Mayor of Wellington – Jim Belich then Fran Wilde
Mayor of Christchurch – Vicki Buck
Mayor of Dunedin – Richard Walls

Events
6 February – Ruby Jubilee of Elizabeth II's accession as Queen of New Zealand
15 June – A by-election is held in the Tamaki electorate after the resignation of former Prime Minister Robert Muldoon. Clem Simich wins the seat and retains it for the National Party.
19 September – An indicative referendum on the voting system is held, with 85% of voters voting to change from the existing First Past the Post system, and 70% voting for Mixed Member Proportional as the replacement system.
27 October – New Zealand is elected to the United Nations Security Council for two years (1993–94) on the third ballot
12 December – A by-election is held in the Wellington Central electorate after Fran Wilde resigns to become Mayor of Wellington. Chris Laidlaw wins the seat and retains it for the Labour Party.
 The country experiences an electricity crisis after drought conditions result in low South Island hydro lake levels.
 Kapiti Marine Reserve is established

Arts and literature
Owen Marshall wins the Robert Burns Fellowship.

See 1992 in art, 1992 in literature, :Category:1992 books

Music

New Zealand Music Awards
Winners are shown first with nominees underneath.
Album of the Year: Headless Chickens – Body Blow
Midge Marsden – Burning Rain
MC OJ & The Rhythm Slave – What Can We Say
Single of the Year: The Exponents – Why Does Love Do This To Me
Headless Chickens – Cruise Control
Push Push – Trippin
Best Male Vocalist: Jordan Luck – (The Exponents)
Mikey Havoc (Push Push)
Shayne Carter (Straitjacket Fits)
Best Female Vocalist: Fiona McDonald – (Headless Chickens)
Moana
Ngaire
Best Group: Push Push
 The Exponents
Headless Chickens
Most Promising Male Vocalist: David Parker – (Parker Project)
Jon Toogood (Shihad)
James Gaylyn
Most Promising Female Vocalist: Teremoana Rapley – (Moana & the Moahunters)
Christina Fuemana (House Party)
Lorina Harding
Most Promising Group: Shihad
The Exponents
These Wilding Ways
International Achievement: Crowded House
Jenny Morris
Straitjacket Fits
Best Video: Mauger Bros – Trippin' (Push Push)
Moana & The Moahunters – AEIOU
Headless Chickens – Cruise Control
Best Producer: Steve Garden – Burning Rain (Midge Marsden)
Rex Visible/ Headless Chickens – Body Blow
Carl Doy – Standing Ovation
Best Engineer: Nick Morgan – Burning Rain (Midge Marsden)
Tony Moan /Steve Smith – World Gone Wild
Ian Morris/ Tim Farrant – What's The Time Mr Wolf
Best Jazz Album: Various / Broadbent / Chisholm / Gibson / Brown – Fine & Dandy
Nairobi Trio – Nairobi Trio
Liz Braggins – Liz Braggins
Best Classical Album: Mcintyre / Doig / Marc – Wagner
Dorian Choir – Images of Light
Viva Voce – Sounds & Sweet Airs
Best Folk Album: Lorina Harding – Lucky Damn Woman
Angela Dixon – Takin A Chance
Martin Curtis – The Daisy Patch
Best Country Album:  John Grenell – Windstar
Barbie Davidson – Borderline
Renderers – Trail of Tears
Best Gospel Album: Pacific Island Choir – O Mai Ia Ia Iesu
Congregational Christian Church – Oe Le Faitoaga Moi
Ambassador Gospel Singers – Hear The Call
Best Polynesian Album: Charles & Andre – CÉst Toi Ma Vie
The Five Stars – Children of Polynesia
Tumuenua Dance Group – Drums, Songs And Chants
Best Māori Album: Moana & The Moahunters – AEIOU
John Rowles – E Te Tamaiti
The Whanau Funksters – Funky Whanau Feeling
Best Songwriter: Neil Finn – Fall at Your Feet (Crowded House)
Jordan Luck – Why Does Love Do This To Me
Neil & Tim Finn – It's Only Natural
Best Cover: Hamish Kilgour – Pink Flying Saucers Over The Southern Alps (Various Artists)
Richard Gourley -'Hold Onto Your Face
Dick Frizzell -What Can We Say?

See: 1992 in music

Performing arts

 Benny Award presented by the Variety Artists Club of New Zealand to Carl Doy ONZM.

Radio and television
25 May: Shortland Street first airs.

See: 1992 in New Zealand television, 1992 in television, List of TVNZ television programming, :Category:Television in New Zealand, TV3 (New Zealand), :Category:New Zealand television shows, Public broadcasting in New Zealand

Film
Alex
Braindead

See: :Category:1992 film awards, 1992 in film, List of New Zealand feature films, Cinema of New Zealand, :Category:1992 films

Internet
See: NZ Internet History

Sport

Athletics
Mark Hutchinson wins his first national title in the men's marathon, clocking 2:16:32 on 25 October in Auckland, while Lee-Ann McPhillips claims her second in the women's championship (2:40:00).

Horse racing

Harness racing
 New Zealand Trotting Cup: Blossom Lady
 Auckland Trotting Cup: Master Musician

Thoroughbred racing

Olympic Games

Summer Olympics

 New Zealand sends a team of 134 competitors in 17 sports.

Winter Olympics

 New Zealand sends a team of nine competitors across three sports.
 Annelise Coberger wins New Zealand's first Winter Olympics medal.

Paralympic Games

Summer Paralympics

 New Zealand sends a team of 13 competitors.

Winter Paralympics

 New Zealand sends a team of seven competitors in one sport.

Shooting
Ballinger Belt – 
Micheil Sweet (Australia)
Diane Collings (Te Puke), sixth, top New Zealander

Soccer
 The Chatham Cup is won by Miramar Rangers who beat Waikato United 3–1 in the final.

Births

January
 1 January
 Dane Cleaver, cricketer
 Aaron James Murphy, actor
 Nathaniel Peteru, rugby league player
 3 January
 Scott Kuggeleijn, cricketer
 Daniel McLay, racing cyclist
 Sio Siua Taukeiaho, rugby league player
 5 January
 Abby Damen, actor
 Hagen Schulte, rugby union player
 6 January – James McDonald, jockey
 7 January – Tohu Harris, rugby league player
 9 January – Joseph Parker, boxer
 10 January – Carlos Tuimavave, rugby league player
 12 January – Cole McConchie, cricketer
 13 January – Sam Cane, rugby union player
 14 January – Te Paea Selby-Rickit, netball player
 15 January
 Matthew Stanley, swimmer
 Chris Ulugia, rugby league player
 16 January – Ihaia West, rugby union player
 17 January – Craig Cachopa, cricketer
 21 January – Gafatasi Su'a, rugby union player
 23 January – TJ Perenara, rugby union player
 24 January – Christian Lloyd, rugby union player
 29 January – Jordan Taufua, rugby union player

February
 1 February
 Christian Huriwai, unicyclist
 Milford Keresoma, rugby union player
 3 February – Bryn Hall, rugby union player
 4 February – Kayla Imrie, canoeist
 5 February – Mitchell Santner, cricketer
 9 February – Caitlin Ryan, canoeist
 11 February – Ope Peleseuma, rugby union player
 13 February – Kayla Cullen, netball player
 14 February – Paterika Vaivai, rugby league player
 15 February – Leigh Kasperek, cricketer
 18 February – Matt Taylor, cricketer
 23 February –  Jamison Gibson-Park, rugby union player
 24 February – Bevan Small, cricketer
 25 February – Rose Matafeo, comedian, television presenter
 26 February – Michael Chee Kam, rugby league player

March
 1 March – Tom Walsh, athlete
 4 March – Omar Slaimankhel, rugby union and rugby league player
 8 March – Nathan Harris, rugby union player
 14 March – Joe Wright, rower
 16 March
 Olivia Merry, field hockey player
 Siate Tokolahi, rugby union player
 17 March – Jake Heenan, rugby union player
 19 March
 Alex Maloney, sailor
 Api Pewhairangi, rugby league player
 25 March – Mosese Fotuaika, rugby league player
 29 March – Morgan Figgins, figure skater

April
 1 April
 Alex Gilbert, adoption advocate
 James Musa, association footballer
 Adam Thomas, association footballer
 2 April – Tom Latham, cricketer
 3 April – Byron Wells, freestyle skier
 4 April – Reggie Goodes, rugby union player
 6 April – Francie Turner, rowing coxswain
 7 April
 Sitaleki Akauola, rugby league player
 Joe Latta, rugby union player
 9 April – Anna Willcox-Silfverberg, freestyle skier
 13 April – Adam Milne, cricketer
 17 April
 Ambrose Curtis, rugby union player
 Erin Nayler, association footballer
 19 April - Ofa Tu'ungafasi, rugby union player
 20 April – Sauaso Sue, rugby league player
 28 April – Lakyn Heperi, musician

May
 3 May – Will Skelton, rugby union player
 8 May – Wayne Ulugia, rugby league player
 9 May – Paul Coll, squash player
 10 May – Malakai Fekitoa, rugby union player
 13 May – Josh Papalii, rugby league player
 19 May
 Kwabena Appiah, association footballer
 Felise Kaufusi, rugby league player
 24 May
 Ethan Rusbatch, basketball player
 Jack Whetton, rugby union player
 26 May
 Isaac Grainger, rower
 Curtis Rona, rugby league player
 28 May - Hannah Wilkinson, association footballer

June
 5 June – Tupou Sopoaga, rugby league player
 6 June – Nela Zisser, model
 8 June – Sean Lovemore, association footballer
 14 June – Penani Manumalealii, rugby league player
 30 June
 Tom Doyle, association footballer
 Grace Prendergast, rower

July
 3 July – Ryan Cocker, rugby union player
 4 July – Brooke Neal, field hockey player
 5 July – Felicity Milovanovich, actor
 8 July – James Lowe, rugby union player
 16 July – Gerard Cowley-Tuioti, rugby union player
 23 July – Seta Tamanivalu, rugby union player
 24 July – Shaun Kirkham, rower
 26 July – Samantha Lucie-Smith, swimmer
 30 July – Adam Barwood, alpine skier
 31 July – John Palavi, rugby league player

August
 6 August – Hamish Northcott, rugby union player
 7 August – Albert Nikoro, rugby union player
 8 August – Jimmy Tupou, rugby union player
 14 August
 Liam Graham, association footballer
 Marty McKenzie, rugby union player
 17 August - Alex Elisala, rugby league player
 20 August – Sulu Tone-Fitzpatrick, netball player
 24 August – James Hunter, rower
 28 August – Willis Feasey, alpine skier

September
 3 September – Michael Davidson, cricketer
 4 September – Princess Chelsea, musician
 5 September – Teimana Harrison, rugby union player
 6 September – Joe Walker, cricketer
 10 September – Hugh Blake, rugby union player
 14 September – Michael Fatialofa, rugby union player
 21 September – Avalon Biddle, motorcycle racer
 24 September
 Pita Ahki, rugby union player
 Darcina Manuel, judoka
 27 September – Eve MacFarlane, rower

October
 7 October – Hayley Jensen, cricketer
 8 October – Octagonal, thoroughbred racehorse
 9 October – Jay White, professional wrestler
 11 October – Ligi Sao, rugby league player
 12 October – Rhys Marshall, rugby union player
 13 October – Alex Kennedy, rower
 19 October – Scott Eade, rugby union player
 20 October – Maddy Green, cricketer
 21 October – Aaron Barclay, triathlete
 22 October – Nathan Flannery, rower
 24 October – Roysyn, thoroughbred racehorse
 26 October
 Matt Proctor, rugby union player
 Sam Vaka, rugby union player
 29 October – Eric Sione, rugby union player
 31 October – Ish Sodhi, cricketer

November
 3 November
 Lance Beddoes, squash player
 Jamie McDell, singer-songwriter
 9 November – Bridgette Armstrong, association footballer
 20 November – Lara Custance, actor
 22 November
 Natalie Dodd, cricketer
 Will Young, cricketer

December
 4 December – Peta Hiku, rugby league player
 8 December
 David Correos, comedian
 Julia King, field hockey player
 9 December – Sarah Goss, rugby union player
 11 December – Megan Craig, squash player
 12 December – Sophia Fenwick, netball player
 17 December – Joe Carter, cricketer
 21 December – Cameron Lindsay, association footballer
 22 December – Aki Seiuli, rugby union player
 23 December – Damon Leitch, motor racing driver
 25 December – Christobelle Grierson-Ryrie, model

Exact date unknown
 Stevie Tonks, singer

Deaths

January–March
 6 January – Steve Gilpin, musician (born 1949)
 18 January – Desmond O'Donnell, rugby union player (born 1921)
 20 January – Snow Bowman, rugby union player (born 1915)
 3 February – Merv Corner, rugby union player, soldier, sports administrator (born 1908)
 19 February – Sir Gordon Minhinnick, cartoonist (born 1902)
 25 February – F. Russell Miller, politician (born 1914)
 9 March – Ethel Gould, politician, MLC (born 1895)
 15 March – Allan Dick, politician (born 1915)

April–June
 21 April – Barry Dallas, doctor, politician (born 1926)
 28 April – Allan Highet, politician (born 1913)
 2 May – 
 Trevor Hatherton, geophysicist, scientific administrator (born 1924)
 Kel Tremain, rugby union player (born 1938)
 9 May – Alex Stenhouse, association footballer (born 1910)
 23 May – Ernst Plischke, architect (born 1903)
 29 May – Mavis Rivers, jazz singer (born 1929)
 4 June – Mortie Foreman, plastics manufacturer (born 1902)
 5 June – Rangitaamo Takarangi, Māori welfare officer and community leader (born 1901)
 9 June – Jim Clayton, rower (born 1911)

July–September
 4 July – Jimmy James, dancer, dance teacher, cabaret proprietor (born 1915)
 10 July – Laurie Haig, rugby union player (born 1922)
 11 July – Douglas St John, cricketer (born 1928)
 17 July – Frank Haigh, lawyer, social reformer (born 1898)
 27 July – Audrey Gale, lawyer, politician (born 1909)
 30 July – John Scott, architect (born 1924)
 July (date unknown) – Mervyn Thompson, playwright, theatre director, drama academic (born 1936)
 2 August –
 Alf Cleverley, boxer (born 1907)
 Roderick Finlayson, writer (born 1904)
 5 August – Sir Robert Muldoon, politician (born 1921)
 6 August – Jack Brooke, yachtsman, yacht designer, research engineer (born 1907)
 14 August – Bill Hamilton, agricultural scientist, scientific administrator (born 1909)
 15 August – Ronald Moore, soldier (born 1915)
 29 August - Ian Hamilton, cricketer (born 1906)
 19 September – Percy Allen, politician (born 1913)

October–December
 1 October – Samantha Dubois, radio presenter (born 1955)
 4 October – Denny Hulme, motor racing driver (born 1936)
 13 October – Ruth Page, political activist (born 1905)
 24 October – Oswald Sanders, Christian teacher, missionary and writer (born 1902)
 6 November – Gordon Innes, rugby union and rugby league player (born 1910)
 18 November – Ken Gray, rugby union player, politician (born 1938)
 22 November – 
 Ronald Sinclair, child actor, film editor (born 1924)
Sir Gerard Wall, surgeon, politician (born 1920)
 12 December – Sir Robert Rex, Niuean politician (born 1909)
 19 December – Eve Sutton, children's author (born 1906)
 26 December – Eve Poole, Mayor of Invercargill (born 1924)
 28 December – Paul Beadle, sculptor and medallist (born 1917)
 29 December – Avice Bowbyes, home science academic (born 1901)
 31 December – Sir Denis Barnett, air force officer (born 1906)

See also
List of years in New Zealand
Timeline of New Zealand history
History of New Zealand
Military history of New Zealand
Timeline of the New Zealand environment
Timeline of New Zealand's links with Antarctica

References

External links

 
New Zealand
Years of the 20th century in New Zealand